In geometry, a  pole and polar are respectively a point and a line that have a unique reciprocal relationship with respect to a given conic section.  

Polar reciprocation in a given circle is the transformation of each point in the plane into its polar line and each line in the plane into its pole.

Properties

Pole and polar have several useful properties:

 If a point P lies on the line l, then the pole L of the line l  lies on the polar p of point P.
 If a point P moves along a line l, its polar p rotates about the  pole L of the line l.
 If two tangent lines can be drawn from a pole to the conic section, then its polar passes through both tangent points.
 If a point lies on the conic section, its polar is the tangent through this point to the conic section.
 If a point P lies on its own polar line, then P is on the conic section.
 Each line has, with respect to a non-degenerated conic section, exactly one pole.

Special case of circles

The pole of a line L in a circle C is a point Q that is the inversion in C of the point P on L that is closest to the center of the circle. Conversely, the polar line (or polar) of a point Q in a circle C is the line L such that its closest point P to the center of the circle is the inversion of Q in C.

The relationship between poles and polars is reciprocal. Thus, if a point A lies on the polar line q of a point Q, then the point Q must lie on the polar line a of the point A. The two polar lines a and q need not be parallel.

There is another description of the polar line of a point P in the case that it lies outside the circle C. In this case, there are two lines through P which are tangent to the circle, and the polar of P is the line joining the two points of tangency (not shown here). This shows that pole and polar line are concepts in the projective geometry of the plane and generalize with any nonsingular conic in the place of the circle C.

Polar reciprocation

For instance, the polar line can be viewed as the set of projective harmonic conjugates of a given point, the pole, with respect to a conic. The operation of replacing every point by its polar and vice versa is known as a polarity.  

A polarity is a correlation that is also an involution.

For some point P and its polar p, any other point Q on p is the pole of a line q through P. This comprises a reciprocal relationship, and is one in which incidences are preserved.

General conic sections

The concepts of pole, polar and reciprocation can be generalized from circles to other conic sections which are the ellipse, hyperbola and parabola.  This generalization is possible because conic sections result from a reciprocation of a circle in another circle, and the properties involved, such as incidence and the cross-ratio, are preserved under all projective transformations.

Calculating the polar of a point  
A general conic section may be written as a second-degree equation in the Cartesian coordinates (x, y) of the plane

where Axx, Axy, Ayy, Bx, By, and C are the constants defining the equation.  For such a conic section, the polar line to a given pole point (ξ, η) is defined by the equation

where D, E and F are likewise constants that depend on the pole coordinates (ξ, η)

Calculating the pole of a line  
The pole of the line  , relative to the non-degenerated conic section 

can be calculated in two steps.

First, calculate the numbers x, y and z from

Now, the pole is the point with coordinates

Tables for pole-polar relations

 Pole-polar relation for an ellipse
 Pole-polar relation for  a hyperbola
 Pole-polar relation for  a parabola

Via complete quadrangle
Given four points forming a complete quadrangle, the lines connecting the points cross in an additional three diagonal points. Given a point Z not on conic C, draw two secants from Z through C crossing at points A, B, D, and E. Then these four points form a complete quadrangle with Z at one of the diagonal points. The line joining the other two diagonal points is the polar of Z, and Z is the pole  of this line.

Applications

Poles and polars were defined by Joseph Diaz Gergonne and play an important role in his solution of the problem of Apollonius.

In planar dynamics a pole is a center of rotation, the polar is the force line of action and the conic is the mass–inertia matrix. The pole–polar relationship is used to define the center of percussion of a planar rigid body. If the pole is the hinge point, then the polar is the percussion line of action as described in planar screw theory.

See also
 Dual polygon
 Dual polyhedron
 Polar curve
 Projective geometry
 Projective harmonic conjugates

Bibliography

 
 
 

References

External links

 Interactive animation with multiple poles and polars at Cut-the-Knot
 Interactive animation with one pole and its polar
 Interactive 3D with coloured multiple poles/polars - open source
 
 
 
 
 Tutorial at Math-abundance

Euclidean plane geometry
Projective geometry
Circles